Parablennius dialloi is a species of combtooth blenny found in the Eastern and Central Atlantic: Cape Verde to Moçâmedes, Angola. The specific name honours the Senegales curator Amadou Diallo of the Musée de la Mer in Gorée Senegal, who provided specimens to Hans Bath and translated for him while he was working in Senegal.

References

Further reading

 Eschmeyer, William N., ed. 1998. Catalog of Fishes. Special Publication of the Center for Biodiversity Research and Information, no. 1, vol. 1–3. California Academy of Sciences. San Francisco, California, USA. 2905. .
 Fenner, Robert M. The Conscientious Marine Aquarist. Neptune City, New Jersey, USA: T.F.H. Publications, 2001.
 Helfman, G., B. Collette and D. Facey: The diversity of fishes. Blackwell Science, Malden, Massachusetts, USA, 1997.
 Moyle, P. and J. Cech.: Fishes: An Introduction to Ichthyology, 4th ed., Upper Saddle River, New Jersey, USA: Prentice-Hall. 2000.
 Nelson, J.: Fishes of the World, 3rd ed.. New York, USA: John Wiley and Sons., 1994

dialloi
Taxa named by Hans Bath
Fish described in 1990
Fish of the Atlantic Ocean
Fish of Africa
Fish of Angola
Fish of West Africa